It's Always the Woman is a British silent motion picture of 1916 directed by Wilfred Noy (1883–1948) and produced by the Clarendon Film Company. It stars Hayden Coffin and Daisy Burrell.

The story was adapted from a play by "Riada" (Bryant Adair).

Outline
The British Film Catalogue says: "Vamp breaks major’s marriage, weds him, and sends his daughter to convent where her 'dead' mother is a nun."

Cast
 Hayden Coffin — Major Sterrington
 Daisy Burrell — Mrs Sterrington 
 Barbara Hoffe — Esmeralda Chetwynde

References

External links

It's Always The Woman at British Film Institute database

1916 films
British films based on plays
Films set in England
British silent feature films
Films directed by Wilfred Noy
British black-and-white films
1910s English-language films